Intel Quartus Prime is programmable logic device design software produced by Intel; prior to Intel's acquisition of Altera the tool was called Altera Quartus Prime, earlier Altera Quartus II. Quartus Prime enables analysis and synthesis of HDL designs, which enables the developer to compile their designs, perform timing analysis, examine RTL diagrams, simulate a design's reaction to different stimuli, and configure the target device with the programmer. Quartus Prime includes an implementation of VHDL and Verilog for hardware description, visual editing of logic circuits, and vector waveform simulation.

Features
Quartus Prime software features include:

 Platform Designer (previously QSys, previously SOPC Builder), a tool that eliminates manual system integration tasks by automatically generating interconnect logic and creating a testbench to verify functionality.
 SoCEDS, a set of development tools, utility programs, run-time software, and application examples to help you develop software for SoC FPGA embedded systems.
 DSP Builder, a tool that creates a seamless bridge between the MATLAB/Simulink tool and Quartus Prime software, so FPGA designers have the algorithm development, simulation, and verification capabilities of MATLAB/Simulink system-level design tools
 External memory interface toolkit, which identifies calibration issues and measures the margins for each DQS signal.
 Generation of JAM/STAPL files for JTAG in-circuit device programmers.

Editions

Lite Edition
The Lite Edition is a free version of Quartus Prime that can be downloaded for free. This edition provided compilation and programming for a limited number of Intel FPGA devices. The low-cost Cyclone family of FPGAs is fully supported by this edition, as well as the MAX family of CPLDs, meaning small developers and educational institutions have no overheads from the cost of development software.

Standard Edition
The Standard Edition supports an extensive number of FPGA devices but requires a license.

Pro Edition
The Pro Edition supports only the latest FPGA devices.

See also
 Xilinx ISE
 Xilinx Vivado
 ModelSim

External links
Intel Quartus Prime Software
Intel FPGAs and Programmable Devices official website
Quartus II Installation Tutorial on Ubuntu 8.04

Electronic design automation software
Proprietary software that uses Qt
Software that uses Qt